The 2018 Atlantic Coast Conference men's soccer season was the 65th season of men's varsity soccer in the conference.

The Wake Forest Demon Deacons are the defending champions of the Atlantic Conference and the North Carolina are the defending champions of the Coastal Conference.  Wake Forest are the defending ACC tournament champions. Both Wake Forest and North Carolina successfully defended their titles, while Louisville won the ACC tournament.

Changes from 2017 

After the 2017 season, Bobby Clark retired as the Notre Dame head coach.  He was replaced by Chad Riley, who was hired from Dartmouth.

After the 2018 season, Louisville Cardinals coach Ken Lolla resigned after 13 years and a 155–77–39 record with the team. He was replaced by John Michael Hayden on December 27, 2018

Teams

Stadiums and locations 

1.  Florida State, Georgia Tech and Miami do not sponsor men's soccer

Personnel

Preseason

Hermann Trophy
Prior to the season two ACC men's soccer players were selected to the MAC Hermann Trophy watch list.

 Alex Comsia, North Carolina
 Jonny Sutherland, Clemson

Preseason poll
The 2018 ACC preseason poll was announced on August 15. Wake Forest and North Carolina were selected to win the Atlantic Division and Coastal Division, respectively. North Carolina was selected as the favorite to win the ACC Championship.  The poll was voted on by all ACC coaches, for a total of 12 possible votes.

ACC championship votes

 North Carolina (10)
 Louisville (1)
 Wake Forest (1)

Regular season poll

Atlantic Division poll

 Wake Forest (8) – 64
 Clemson (4) – 60
 Louisville – 53
 NC State – 31
 Syracuse – 29
 Boston College – 15

Coastal Division poll

 North Carolina (11) – 70
 Virginia (1) – 53
 Duke – 46
 Notre Dame – 40
 Pittsburgh – 28
 Virginia Tech – 15

Preseason national polls 

Eight of the programs were ranked in one of the five major preseason polls. CollegeSoccerNews.com and Hero Sports use a Top 30 ranking throughout the season, while United Soccer, Soccer America, and Top Drawer Soccer use a Top 25 ranking throughout the season.

Regular season 

All times Eastern time.

Week 1 (Aug 20–26) 
Schedule and results:

Players of the week:

Week 2 (Aug 27–Sept 2)
Schedule and results:

Players of the week:

Week 3 (Sept 3–9) 
Schedule and results:

Players of the week:

Week 4 (Sept 10–16)
Schedule and results:

Players of the week:

Week 5 (Sept 17–23) 
Schedule and results:

Players of the week:

Week 6 (Sept 24–30) 
Schedule and results:

Players of the week:

Week 7 (Oct 1–7) 
Schedule and results:

Players of the week:

Week 8 (Oct 8–14) 
Schedule and results:

Players of the week:

Week 9 (Oct 15–21) 
Schedule and results:

Players of the week:

Week 10 (Oct 22–28)
Schedule and results:

Players of the week:

Week 11 (Oct 29–Nov 4) 
Schedule and results:

Note: Rankings shown are seedings from ACC tournament

Week 12 (Nov 5–11) 
Schedule and results:
Note: Rankings shown are seedings from ACC tournament

Rankings

United Soccer

Top Drawer Soccer

Postseason

ACC tournament

NCAA tournament

Awards

Postseason awards 

The Atlantic Coast Conference post season awards were announced on November 7, 2018, the same day as the Semifinals of the ACC tournament.

All-ACC awards and teams

All-Americans

United Soccer Coaches

MLS SuperDraft

Total picks by school

List of selections

Homegrown contracts

References 

 
2018 NCAA Division I men's soccer season